Harjinder Singh Dilgeer (Punjabi: ਹਰਜਿੰਦਰ ਸਿੰਘ ਦਿਲਗੀਰ, born 22 October 1965) He is the only author who has written Complete History of the Sikhs (in 10 volumes, 3716 pages) and has translated Guru Granth Sahib in English (7 volumes, 3747 pages) and has published NEW MAHAN KOSH (ਨਵਾਂ ਮਹਾਨ ਕੋਸ਼) Encyclopedia of Sikh literature, Punjab & Sikh History {3 of the 4 volumes of the NEW Mahan Kosh (3 volumes running into 1900 pages) have been published in March 2021 (all the 4 volumes 848 pages. 4 volumes total 2748 pages). He has written in detail about the concept and the history of Akal Takht Sahib, Sikh culture, Shiromani Akali Dal, history of Anandpur Sahib, and Kiratpur Sahib, Dictionary of Sikh Philosophy etc. The Sikh Reference Book is his magnum opus. 'The Sikh Reference Book' is an encyclopaedia consisting of more than 2400 biographies, complete chronology of Sikh history, 400 concepts of Sikh philosophy as well more than 800 Sikh shrines. He has produced a Sikh Encyclopedia CD-ROM. His latest books are Encyclopedia of Jalandhar (English), Banda Singh Bahadur (Punjabi and English), Sikh Twareekh in five volumes (a complete Sikh history, from 1469 to 2007, in Punjabi), Sikh History in ten volumes (a complete Sikh history, from 1469 to 2011, in English); and English translations of Nitnaym (the Sikh daily prayer) and Sukhmani Sahib.. His latest work is English translation (with explanation) of Guru Granth Sahib, in seven volumes (published in March 2016) and an Sikh encyclopedia named Nawah Mahan Kosh (ਨਵਾਂ ਮਹਾਨ ਕੋਸ਼) consisting of four volumes (the final volume was published in April 2022).

Early life

Dilgeer was born on 22 October 1965, in the family of Gurbakhsh Singh and Jagtar Kaur, at Jalandhar, Punjab, India. in a family originally from Jaisalmer, in Rajasthan, then Mehraj village (now in Bathinda district). He was later based in Jalandhar and Jalalabad (Firozpur), and finally in Oslo. He is a citizen of Norway, and, presently lives in England.

Education & Job (Teaching & Journalism)
Dilgeer passed his M.A. in English,  Punjabi and Philosophy. He did his M.A. in history but did not appear in final examination. He was awarded degrees of M.Phil. LL.B. and Ph.D. by Panjab University Chandigarh.. He has passed the degree of Adi Granth Acharya (from PU Chandigarh); he has several other degrees and diplomas as well.

He started teaching in various colleges in the Punjab and finally at the Panjab University Chandigarh. He has been visiting teacher of the P.U. Patiala as well. He has been teaching in Canada and England too. He has been Director of 'Sikh History Research Board' as well as 'Sikh Reference Library' (SGPC). He is a former Director of Guru Nanak Institute of Sikh Studies. At present he is Director of Guru Nanak Research Institute (Birmingham, England).  He is also the examiner of the M.Phil and Ph.D. of various universities in India, Pakistan and England. He is also the Editor-in-Chief of "The Sikhs: Past& resent".  He is also the Director of thesikhs.org (perhaps the biggest website of Sikhism).

He has been the editor of the newspapers 'the Punjab Times' (London) and 'the Sikh Times' (Birmingham), England).

Awards
In Denmark in 1995, he was presented with the 'Shan-i-Punjab' award; in 2004 he was given the 'Giani Garja Singh Award' in Ludhiana; in 2005, he was presented with the 'Kohinoor Award', 'National Professor of Sikh Studies' award and a gold medal in Birmingham (England); in 2006 he was given the 'Bhai Gurdas' award in Amritsar; and in 2009 he was presented with the 'National Professor of Sikh History' award at Chandigarh. In 2014 he was awarded gold medal at Toronto (Canada).
Dr Harjinder Singh Dilgeer was given award of "Heera-e-Qaum" (Gem of Nation, PANTH RATAN) by the Haryana SGPC, on 11 November 2017.

History Research
Dr. Thakar Singh Ikolaha India's Freedom Fighter (2013, English) 
Emergency Ke Atyachaar, Hindi)
Shiromani Akali Dal: A History (Revised and enlarged in 2000, Punjabi)
Akal Takht {Concept & History} (English, revised and enlarged in 1995, revised and enlarged in 2011) 
Akal Takht Sahib  (revised and enlarged in 2000 and 2005, Punjabi)
The Sikhs' Struggle for Sovereignty (1992, English)
1955 Da Punjabi Suba Morcha, with 400 photographs (1999 Punjabi),
Anandpur Sahib History (Light & Sound play, 2000, Punjabi and English). Played daily at Anandgarh fort, Anandpur Sahib.
Shiromani Gurdwara Parbandhak Committee Kiven Bani History (2000, Punjabi)
Akal Takht Sahib: Falsfa Te Twarikh (2000, Punjabi; it is a revised and enlarged edition of the first edition published in 1986 from Oslo, Norway, fully revised and enlarged  2005)
Shiromani Akali Dal, History: 1920-2000 (2000, Punjabi; it is an enlarged edition of the first edition of 1978),
Guru De Sher {Life stories of more then 230 Martyrs of Guru Period}(2001 Punjabi),
Keeratpur Sahib Da Itihas (2002, Punjabi)
Anandpur Sahib, a history (Punjabi 1998 & 2003, and English, 2003)
Encyclopaedia of Jalandhar (2004, English)
Mata Gujri Char Sahibzadey Chalih Muktey (Punjabi, 2005, fully revised and enlarged 2015)
Mahan Sikh Jarnail Banda Singh Bahadur (Punjabi, 2006)
Sikh Twareekh de Ghallughare (Punjabi 2007 2013)
Makhan Shah Lubana and Lubana Community (Punjabi 2008)
SIKH TWAREEKH in 5 volumes (Punjabi, 2008)
Sikh Twareeh in 5 volumes (Sikh history in Punjabi, 2008, fully revised and enlarged 2015)
Bhai Mani Singh Tay Unhan Da Parvaar? (Life of Bhai Mani Singh and 54 martyrs of his family, Punjabi, 2010)
100 Sikh Bibian (Lives of more than 100 prominent Sikh ladies, Punjabi, 2010).
Anandpur Sahib - A History (Punjabi 1998, Hindi 2000)
SIKH HISTORY in 10 VOLUMES (English, 2010–11)
Damdami Taksaal & other essays true history of 'damdami taksal' and truth about 'dasam granth'; (Punjabi, December 2014)
Sikh Itihas vich Ajj Da Din (the day today, in the Sikh History) 2 volumes (January to June, July to December), (Punjabi, December 2014).
Lohgarh: Banda Singh Bahadur's Fort, (English) 2018.

Edited works (History)
Jaito Morchey De Akhin Ditthe Hal (2000, 2003, Punjabi)
Sikh Te Sikhi (original by Harinder Singh Roop)
Jangan (original by Principal Satbir Singh)
Babar Akali Lehar Te Is De Agu (original by Gurbachan Singh)
Punjabi Suba Morcha 1955 (original by Mohinder Singh & Karam Singh Zakhmi)
Loh Garh - Banda Singh's Capital (Punjabi, 2008)
Master Tara Singh De Lekh, two volumes

Tracts (History)
Gurdwara Alamgir da Itihas
Master Tara Singh (Life & Work)
Anandpur Sahib Ate Keeratpur Sahib De Gurdware (335,000 copies of this work were published in Punjabi, Hindi and English, in 1999 in connection with the tercentenary of Khalsa)

Encyclopedias
The Sikh Reference book (1996–97, English) [an encyclopaedia]
Philosophy of Sikh Dictionary (English)
Dilgeer Kosh, ਦਿਲਗੀਰ ਕੋਸ਼, Punjabi, April 2018,. It is encyclopedia of Guru Granth Sahib, Punjab and Sikh History.
NAVAN MAHAN KOSH, ਨਵਾਂ ਮਹਾਨ ਕੋਸ਼, volume 2 of DILGEER KOSH, was published in February 2020; and, [NAVAN TE VADDA MAHAN KOSH, ਨਵਾਂ ਤੇ ਵੱਡਾ ਮਹਾਨ ਕੋਸ਼], volume 3  of DILGEER KOSH has been published in March 2021. Total pages of 3 volumes are 1900+. There are about 60,000 entries, 1500 biographies (with many photographs), information about more than 600 Gurdwaras and places (with about 700 photos). There are more than 2275 entries of Persian and more than 1703 entries of Arabic words in the first 3 volumes. Fourth volume (ਨਵਾਂ ਸੰਪੂਰਨ ਮਹਾਨ ਕੋਸ਼) is likely to be published very soon. That will make about one lakh entries, 2500 biographies, history of about 1000 Gurdwaras and major cities of the world (with hundreds of photos); thousands of words of Prakrit, Apbharansh, Sanskrit, Puadhi, Lehndi, Pali, Persian, Arabic etc. Book will have 2748 pages. There will be hundreds of coloured photographs in all the 4 volumes.

Introduction to Sikhism and Punjab
Who Are the Sikhs? (mini book, in 1991, English; Danish 1994; Norwegian 2010)
(The) Sikh Culture (2002, new edition 2010 English)
Sikh Culture (1992, and an enlarged edition in 1994 and 1996, Punjabi; 1994)
Sikh Sabhayachar (2003, Hindi; published by the Delhi Sikh Gurdwara Management Committee)
Sikh Masley (1998 Punjabi)
Sikh Philosophy Ki Hai Te Hor Lekh (2001, 2003, 2005, 2007 Punjabi. It is an enlarged edition of Sikh Culture).
Sikh Philosophy Di Dictionary (Punjabi, 2009)
Sikh Kaun Han (Punjabi edition in 1999, 2007, 2020; English edition as Who Are the Sikhs? in 2000, Hindi 2004 & 2020)
Who Are the Sikhs (English, 2000, 2007, 2009, 2011, 2020; French 2004; Spanish 2007; Norwegian 2007)
Qui Sont Les Sikhs? (Who Are the Sikhs in French 2004)
Quienes Son Los Sikhs? (Who Are the Sikhs in Spanish, 2007)
Hvem Er Sikhene? (Who Are the Sikhs in Norwegian, 2007)

Sikh Scripture
Guru Granth Sahib: English translation (with explanation), 7 volumes (English), March 2016)
Nitnaym & Other Baanis (English translation of Sikh daily hymns, 2009)
Ravidas Baani (English translation of hymns by Bhagat Ravidas, 2010)
Nitnaym Sateek (Punjabi paraphrasing of Sikh daily hymns, 2010)
Japuji Sahib(Punjabi paraphrasing of Sikh hymn, Japuji Sahib, 2010)
Sukhmani Sahib (English translation of Sukhmani Sahib, April 2010)
Spiritual Manifesto of the World: Guru Granth Sahib? (English, 2010)

Literay Works
Dilgeer as a poet: Dr Harjinder Singh Dilgeer is a good poet also. He writes both in Urdu and Punjabi. His poetry works include: Eskimo Smile (Punjabi), Jujharoo Kalaam (Punjabi), Dilgeerian (Urdu & Punjabi) and Diwan-i-Dilgeer (Urdu).
He is a short story writer also.
Kamu Ronda Rahega (a novelette in Punjabi)
Ikki Ghante, a book of stories (later published under the title of Yaaran Kahanian Te Ikk Novelette (in Punjabi)
Poetry editing:
1960 Ton Baad Di Navin Punjabi Kavita. Edited (a collection of poems written after 1960, in Punjabi).
Akali Lehar Da Kalam (edited,Punjabi) {poetry of Akali Movement}.

References

Indian religious writers
Sikh writers
Living people
Panjab University alumni
20th-century Indian historians
20th-century Indian novelists
20th-century Indian poets
20th-century Indian biographers
People from Jalandhar
Writers from Punjab, India
Year of birth missing (living people)